Alejandro Falla was the defending champion, but lost in the quarterfinals to Jordi Samper-Montaña.

Daniel Gimeno-Traver won the title, defeating Gastão Elias 6–3, 1–6, 7–5 in the final.

Seeds

Draw

Finals

Top half

Bottom half

References
 Main Draw
 Qualifying Draw

Claro Open Bucaramanga - Singles
2015 Singles